The March 733 was a Formula 3 car built by March Engineering in 1973. Tony Brise won the 1973 Championship driving this car. It is powered by the  Ford Twin Cam straight-four engine.

References

Formula Three cars
1970s cars